Thuận Thành No 1 High School is one of the top ranked high schools in Bắc Ninh Province and which were in Vietnam's Top 100 High School for many years. Chi

Headmasters
Nguyen Tien Chan 
Tran Dang Phat
Ha Duc Tu

Alumni
Hero of Labor Phan Duy Thuong
Prof.Dr. Vuong Huu Tan - Director General of Vietnam Agency for Radiation and Nuclear Safety (VARANS)

High schools in Vietnam
Educational institutions established in 1961
Provincial public magnet high schools in Vietnam
1961 establishments in North Vietnam